This is a list of the women who have been queens consort of the Frankish people. As all monarchs of the Franks have been required by law and tradition to be male, there has never been a queen regnant of the Franks (although some women have governed as regents).

A timeline of consorts Frankish rulers is difficult since the realm was, according to old Germanic practice, frequently divided among the sons of a leader upon his death and then eventually reunited.  Another factor is the practice of polygamy in the Frankish society, and it is unclear who was a concubine, a mistress, or a legal wife.  Most of early Merovingian queens are nothing but names, and almost nothing is known about them.

This list starts from the earliest dates of Frankish history from the early Queen of the Salian Franks,  to Saint Clotilde, the first Queen of All the Franks, until the three-way split up of the Frankish Empire in the Treaty of Verdun in 843 and then from there to the rise of Hugh Capet in Western Francia and Otto the Great in Eastern Francia.

Merovingian dynasty (450–751) 
The marital status of some wives of early Frankish kings are unclear and polygamy was practiced.

Queen of the Salian Franks (until 509)

Queen of All the Franks (509–511)

Clovis I united all the Frankish petty kingdoms as well as most of Roman Gaul under his rule, conquering the Domain of Soissons of the Roman general Syagrius as well as the Visigothic Kingdom of Toulouse. He took his seat at Paris, which along with Soissons, Reims, Metz, and Orléans became the chief residences. Upon his death, the kingdom was split among his four sons:

Queen of Soissons (511–558)

Queen of Paris (511–558)

Queen of Orléans (511–524)

Queen of Reims (511–555)

Queen of All the Franks (558–561)

Queen of Neustria (Soissons, 561–613)

Queen of Paris (561–567)

Queen of Burgundy (Orléans, 561–613)

Queen of Austrasia (Reims and Metz, 561–613)

Queen of All the Franks (613–629)

Queen of Neustria and Burgundy (629–691)

Queen of Austrasia (623–679)

Queen of Aquitaine (629–632)

Queen of All the Franks (629–751)

Carolingian dynasty (751–987)

Queen of the Franks (751–843)
{| width=95% class="wikitable"
!Picture
!Name 
!Father
!Birth
!Marriage
!Became Consort
!Ceased to be Consort
!Death
!Spouse
|-
|align="center"| 
|align="center"| Bertrada of Laon
|align="center"| Caribert, Count of Laon
|align="center"| 710/27 
|align="center"| 740
|align="center"| November 751as sole-Queen consort of the Franks
|align="center"| 24 September 768husband's death
|align="center"| 12 July 783
|align="center"| Pepin I
|-
|align="center"| 
|align="center"| Gerberga
|align="center"| ?
|align="center"| ?
|align="center"| ?
|align="center"| 24 September 768as co-Queen consort of the Franks
|align="center"|  4 December 771husband's death
|align="center"| ?
|align="center"| Carloman I
|-
|align="center"| 
|align="center"| Gerperga of the Lombards
|align="center"| Desiderius, King of the Lombards
|align="center"| ?
|align="center" colspan="2"| 770as co-Queen consort of the Franks
|align="center"| 771repuditated 
|align="center"| ?
|align="center" rowspan="4"| Charles I
|-
|align="center"| 
|align="center"| Hildegard of Vinzgouw
|align="center"| Gerold of Vinzgouw
|align="center"| 758
|align="center" colspan="2"| 771 as sole-Queen consort of the Franks 774  as Queen consort the Lombards781  as co-Queen consort the Lombards
|align="center" colspan="2"| 30 April 783
|-
|align="center"| 
|align="center"| Fastrada de Franconie
|align="center"| Raoul III de Franconie et d'Aéda de Bavière
|align="center"| 765
|align="center" colspan="2"| 784 as sole-Queen consort of the Franks and co-Queen consort the Lombards
|align="center" colspan="2"| 10 October 794
|-
|align="center"| 
|align="center"| Luitgard de Sundgau
|align="center"| Luitfrid II, Count of Sundgau
|align="center"| 776
|align="center" colspan="2"| 794as sole-Queen consort of the Franks and co-Queen consort the Lombards
|align="center" colspan="2"| 4 June 800
|-
|align="center"| 
|align="center"| Ermengarde of Hesbaye
|align="center"| Ingerman, Count of Hesbaye
|align="center"| 778
|align="center"| 794/5 
|align="center"| 813as Holy Roman Empress and Queen consort of the Franks 817as senior Holy Roman Empress
|align="center" colspan="2"| 3 October 818
|align="center" rowspan="2"| Louis I
|-
|align="center"| 
|align="center"| Judith of Bavaria
|align="center"| Welf I, Count of Altdorf
|align="center"| 805 
|align="center" colspan="2"| 819<small>as senior Holy Roman Empress and Queen consort of the Franks</small> 
|align="center"| 20 June 840husband's death|align="center"| 19/23 April 843
|-
!Picture
!Name 
!Father
!Birth
!Marriage
!Became Consort
!Ceased to be Consort
!Death
!Spouse
|}

After the Treaty of Verdun
The Frankish kingdom was then divided by the Treaty of Verdun in 843. Lothair I was allowed to keep his imperial title and his kingdom of Italy, and granted the newly created Kingdom of Middle Francia, a corridor of land stretching from Italy to the North Sea, and including the Low Countries, the Rhineland (including Aachen), Burgundy, and Provence. Charles the Bald was confirmed in Aquitaine, where Pepin I's son Pepin II was opposing him, and granted West Francia (modern France), the lands west of Lothair's Kingdom. Louis the German was confirmed in Bavaria and granted East Francia (modern Germany), the lands east of Lothair's kingdom.  Ermentrude of Orléans (first wife of Charles II) became the Queen of Western Francia (eventually France); Emma of Altdorf (wife of Louis II) became the Queen of Eastern Francia (eventually Germany); and Ermengarde of Tours (wife of Lothair I) became the Queen of Middle Francia (eventually Lotharingia).  The title of Queen of the Franks continued on to the 12th and 13th century in France.

Queen of the Franks (843–987)

After the death of Louis V of France, the last male line Carolingian king of the Franks, in 987, the Capetian succeeded to the Frankish titles and their consort bear the title Queen consort of the Franks until 1227.  Although history known them better as Queen consorts of France.Although some of these Frankish queens held titles such as Holy Roman Empress, Queen consort of Italy, Aquitaine, Saxony, Burgundy, Orléans, Paris, Bavaria, Provence, Soissons, Lotharingia, Swabia, and Alamannia; this is not a complete list of those consorts.''

See also

 Kings of France family tree
 List of French monarchs
 List of French consorts
 List of Frankish kings
 List of Holy Roman Empresses
 List of German queens

References

Sources

 
Frankish
Frankish
Frankish Queen

Lists of French women

fr:Liste des reines de France